Cream roll may refer to:

Food 
 Cream bun, a sweet bun or bread roll filled with cream
 Swiss roll, a rolled sponge cake filled with cream

Others 
 Cream Roll, a mountain of the Kumaon Himalayas.